Night of the Orangutan is a 1992 Swedish drama film directed by Kjell-Åke Andersson. Rolf Lassgård won the award for Best Actor at the 28th Guldbagge Awards. The film was also nominated for Best Film, Best Director and Best Screenplay.

Cast
 Nick Börjlind as Osvald Nilsson
 Rolf Lassgård as Fritz Algot 'Tjaffo' Nilsson
 Ann Petrén as Victoria Nilsson
 Gunilla Röör as Birgitta
 Krister Henriksson as Bertil
 Halvar Björk as Sunden
 Lena Strömdahl as Aunt
 Jimmy Almström as Läppen
 Yvonne Schaloske as Puddingen
 Bertil Norström as Erik Davidsson
 Wallis Grahn as Rut Davidsson
 Tomas Norström as Vicar
 Leif Andrée as Hogga

References

External links
 
 

1992 films
1992 drama films
Swedish drama films
1990s Swedish-language films
Films directed by Kjell-Åke Andersson
Films set in 1959
1990s Swedish films